The Prehistoric Rock-Art Site Pala Pinta is a Paleolithic-era rock-art site, recognized for cave paintings in the Portuguese municipality of Alijó, in the civil parish of Carlão e Amieiro.

History
The cave was occupied during the 3rd millennium, and the rock art paintings were likely created during this period.

After its discovery, on 30 December 1985, there was a move by the Serviço Regional de Arqueologia da Zona Norte (North Zone Regional Archaeological Service) to have the site classified for protection. There was a positive reaction on 21 April 1986 to the endeavour by the Consultative Council of IPPC. Further initiatives were undertaken on 7 May by the Secretária de Estado da Cultura (Secretary-of-State for Culture) to classify the archaeological site as a National Monument. Although this was never promulgated, on 18 July 2006, the area was defined as a Zona Especial de Classificação (Special Classification Zone) by the DRPorto.

Architecture
It was situated in an isolated, rural area in the middle of the hilltop facing the east.

There roughly two vertical panels, caused by fractures in the cave/clifftop, consisting of monochromatic paintings in ochre of radial imagery (likely sun or stars), points and anthropomorphic representations of figures.

References

Notes

Sources
 
 
 

Prehistoric Rockart Pala Pinta
Vila Real District
Alijó
Prehistoric Rockart Pala Pinta
Prehistoric sites in Portugal